The Hood–Anderson Farm is a historic home and farm and national historic district located at Eagle Rock, Wake County, North Carolina, a suburb of the state capital Raleigh. The main house was built about 1839, and is an example of transitional Federal / Greek Revival style I-house. It is two stories with a low-pitched hip roof and a rear two-story, hipped-roof ell.  The front facade features a large, one-story porch, built in 1917, supported by Tuscan order columns. Also on the property are the contributing combined general store and post office (1854), a one-room dwelling, a two-room tenant/slave house, a barn (1912), a smokehouse, and several other outbuildings and sites including a family cemetery.

In April 1999, the Hood–Anderson Farm was listed on the National Register of Historic Places.

See also
 List of Registered Historic Places in North Carolina

References

Farms on the National Register of Historic Places in North Carolina
Historic districts on the National Register of Historic Places in North Carolina
Houses completed in 1839
Greek Revival houses in North Carolina
Houses in Wake County, North Carolina
National Register of Historic Places in Wake County, North Carolina